Homa Bay Town is a constituency in Kenya. It is one of eight constituencies in Homa Bay County.

References 

Constituencies in Homa Bay County